Čedomir Božić (born 19 October 1984) is a politician in Serbia. He has served as minister of agriculture, water management, and forestry in the government of Vojvodina since 2020. Previously, he was the mayor of Žabalj from 2012 to 2020. Originally a member of the Democratic Party (Demokratska stranka, DS), Božić has been a member of the Serbian Progressive Party (Srpska napredna stranka, SNS) since 2016.

Early life and career
Božić was born in Novi Sad, in what was then the Socialist Autonomous Province of Vojvodina in the Socialist Republic of Serbia, Socialist Federal Republic of Yugoslavia. He was educated in Čurug and Bečej and later graduated from the faculty of economics at the University of Novi Sad in Subotica (2008). He began working in the municipal administration of Žabalj in 2009.

Politician

Mayor of Žabalj
Božić received the second position on the Democratic Party's electoral list for Žabalj in the 2012 Serbian local elections. The list won seven out of thirty-one seats; no party came close to winning a majority, and Democratic Party was able to form a coalition government after the election with Božić as mayor. At the time of his inauguration, he was the youngest mayor in Serbia. The Democrats initially governed in an alliance with the Socialist Party of Serbia, but that party went into opposition later in the year and its place was taken by Rich Serbia. As of 2014, the local administration was an extremely heterogeneous group that also consisted of the League of Social Democrats of Vojvodina, United Serbia, New Serbia, the Party of United Pensioners of Serbia, the Democratic Party of Serbia, and the Serbian Radical Party.

The DS split in 2014, with several members joining Boris Tadić's breakaway New Democratic Party (later renamed as the Social Democratic Party). In March 2014, Božić announced that the entire DS board in Žabalj would join Tadić's party. He returned to the DS in February 2015, however, saying that it was the only pro-European opposition party in the country. This reconciliation proved brief; he left for a second time in February 2016. 

Božić led an independent list called Our Municipality of Žabalj in the 2016 Serbian local elections and won nine seats, finishing second against the Progressive Party. He and his group joined the Progressives in May 2016, and he was confirmed for a second term as mayor shortly thereafter. He subsequently led the Progressives to a majority victory in the 2020 local elections with fifteen out of twenty-one seats in a reduced assembly. He was again confirmed as mayor in September 2020, although his term was cut short by his appointment to the provincial ministry the following month.

Božić highlighted a variety of infrastructure projects in Žabalj in a 2017 sponsored interview.

Provincial cabinet minister
On 29 October 2020, Božić was appointed as minister of agriculture, water management, and forestry in the provincial administration of Igor Mirović. In an interview published in January 2021, he indicated that his department had a budget of close to seven billion dollars and that his priorities would be small and medium-sized farms and co-operation with local governments.

References

1984 births
Living people
People from Novi Sad
People from Žabalj
Mayors of places in Serbia
Government ministers of Vojvodina
Democratic Party (Serbia) politicians
Social Democratic Party (Serbia) politicians
Serbian Progressive Party politicians